Bhagadatta was the mythical son of Narakasura, and the king of Pragjyotisha. Bhagadatta was born from a limb of the asura called Bāṣkala. He was a renowned warrior, and was known to be a great friend of Indra. When Arjuna embarked on a conquest to help his brother Yudhishthira perform the Rajasuya Yagya, Bhagadatta was one of the first kings to be conquered by him.

He was particularly skilled in the use of elephants in warfare. Riding on his elephant Supratik, he fought valiantly in the battle of Kurukshetra on behalf of the Kauravas. At this time he was very old. He was so old, in fact, that he tied his wrinkled eyelids with a silken handkerchief so that they could cover his eyes in battle. He was succeeded by his son Vajradatta. He fought for the  Kaurava in the Mahabharata war. He was the leader of a great army of Kiratas and Chinas in the war.

Life in mythology
In the Battle of Kurukshetra, Bhagadatta fought on the side of the Kauravas. He had long history of enmity with the Pandavas side. His father was Narakasura who was killed in the hands of Shree Krishna. Arjuna's victorious visit in connection with the Rajasuya Yagya performed by Yudhishthira caused a feeling of jealousy in Bhagadatta's heart, and he fought against Arjuna. The courage and might Arjuna showed in the battle astonished Bhagadatta, who congratulated Arjuna on his courage and accepted the defeat that Arjuna had received. Again during Ashwamedha yagya, Arjuna fought against Vajradatta, his son.

Bhagadatta was arguably the oldest of all the warriors on the battlefield. He was all wrinkled, golden white long hair giving him the appearance of a lion. He had to tie a silk cloth over his forehead so that the skin flap of his eyebrows would stay in place and would not fall down to obstruct his vision. He rode on a huge elephant, Supratika. He was a good friend of Indra. During the war, he contributed 1 Akshauhini of the troops.
During the first day of the battle, Bhagadatta had a duel with the king of Virata.
On the fourth day of the Kurukshetra War, Bhima was raided by Bhagadatta's division. Bhagadatta caused Bhīmasena to faint in the field. The demon Ghatotkacha, who was the son of Bhima, became enraged and disappeared from the scene there and then. He reappeared in an instant, creating a terrifying illusion of a fierce form riding on the four trunks of Airavata created by the powers of his Maya. He created the other heavenly elephants, such as Anjana, Vamana and Mahapadma, following him on a wild procession ridden by demons. Ghatotkacha then urged to fight with his own elephant, who wanted to kill Bhagadatta and his elephant. And those other elephants, excited by anger and each with four teeth, urged on by demons of great power, fell on Bhagadatta's elephant from all sides and afflicted him with their teeth. And Bhagadatta's elephant, thus in pain, cried loudly like Indra's thunder. And hearing those terrible and loud cries of that roaring elephant, Bhishma, the commander of the Kauravas, asked all the kings to retreat for the day. He was defeated in his fight with Ghaṭotkacha.

On the seventh day, there was another confrontation between them. Ghatotkacha attacked Bhagadatta and rained arrows and arrows on him. Heavy weapons were thrown at each other and in the end the king struck Ghatotkacha in all his four limbs. He stood for a while and then exerted all his might and threw a magical golden shaft towards the elephant Supratika. Bhagadatta quickly broke the shaft into three parts. Ghatotkach fled the encounter that day and retreated to fight again another day.
After this there was a war with King Dasharna in which the king was defeated. Shortly thereafter Bhagadatta cut off the hands of Kshatredev. Bhima's army charioteer Vishok fell down after being hit by Bhagadatta's arrows and fell unconscious. 

On the twelfth day of the Kurukshetra war, Duryodhana sent a large army of elephants against Bhima. Bhima killed all the elephants with his mace. The news spread rapidly and reached Bhagadatta. Bhagadatta charged his elephant against Bhima and crushed his chariot and killed his horse and charioteer under Supratika's feet. Bhima escaped by jumping from his chariot and fell down between the legs of the elephant. Due to pain, he injured the elephant's limbs by cutting it. An enraged Supratika grabbed Bhima by the trunk of her neck but Bhima managed to escape from her grip and came under the elephant again. He also tried to hurt the elephant further, but was waiting for another elephant to come to his rescue. The Kaurava army thought that Bhima had been killed by the animal, and began to celebrate. Bhima's elder brother Yudhishthira felt grieved and asked the king of Dasarana to accuse Bhagadatta with his division of elephants. In a fight between Supratika and Dasara's elephant, Supratika crushes and kills Dasara's elephants. In this scuffle, Bhima escaped safely.

Bhagadatta killed King Dasharna and Ruciparvan.

Several warriors like Abhimanyu and Satyaki tried to stop Bhagadatta but they weren't successful and then, Bhagadatta headed towards Yudhishthira's position. Bhagadatta with his elephant started crushing the army of Pandavas like a wild elephant. Krishna rides Arjuna to face Bhagadatta and Supratika. The battle ensued with Arjuna on his chariot and Bhagadatta on his elephant, both armed with armour. Bhagadatta tried to break Arjuna's chariot with his elephant. But he could not succeed here. Bhagadatta tried all his weapons and spears, which were cut by Arjuna. Arjuna cut off Bhagadatta's bow and all the spears he had thrown. Arjuna was successful in destroying the flag hoisting on the elephant seat. Bhagadatta was getting angry like a madman, and he threw the deadly weapon, a super-aghosh Vaishnavastra.

Before Arjuna could counter this weapon, however, Krishna intervened by standing in the charioteer's position. Krishna let his chest become a cushion for his powerful weapon, which turned into a garland and fell on Krishna (a weapon given to Bhagadatta by Lord Vishnu eventually returned to his incarnation). In the end, Bhagadatta was killed by Arjuna by shooting a deadly arrow into his chest.

Arjuna got down from his chariot and went around the fallen Bhagadatta through Pradakshina to pay his last respects to his father's friend, one of the greatest warriors since he was too a Indra's son.

After his death, his son, Vajradatta became the king of Pragjyotish. Later, he was also killed by the Arjuna in a battle. King Shailaya, who was Bhagadatta's grandfather, attained Indraloka because of the greatness of his penance.

In Kalika Purana, Harshacharita, Puranas and in other epics; Naraka is said to have sons namely Bhagadatta, Mahasirsa, Madavan and Sumali. Vajradatta and Pushpadatta are sons of Bhagadatta.

See also
 Kamarupa kingdom
 Historicity of the Mahabharata

Notes

References

 
 

 Characters in the Mahabharata
 Pragjyotisha Kingdom

no:Bhagadatta austenia